Psychroflexus salarius  is a Gram-negative, aerobic, moderately halophilic and non-motile bacteria from the genus of Psychroflexus which has been isolated from the Gomso salt pan in Buan County in Korea.

References

Further reading

External links 

Type strain of Psychroflexus salarius at BacDive -  the Bacterial Diversity Metadatabase

Flavobacteria
Bacteria described in 2014